Artajona is a town and municipality located in the province and autonomous community of Navarre, northern Spain.

Demography 
From:INE Archiv

References

External links
Ayuntamiento de Artajona
 ARTAJONA in the Bernardo Estornés Lasa - Auñamendi Encyclopedia (Euskomedia Fundazioa) 
la pagina de angel maria andueza

Municipalities in Navarre